The 1983 Grand National (officially known as the 1983 The Sun Grand National for sponsorship reasons) was the 137th renewal of the Grand National horse race that took place at Aintree Racecourse near Liverpool, England, on 9 April 1983.

The race was won by Corbiere, the first Grand National winner to have been trained by a female trainer in Jenny Pitman. His jockey was Ben de Haan.

The favourite of the 41-strong field was last year's winner Grittar, at odds of 7/1. Going over Valentine's, the 23rd fence, Corbiere held a four-length advantage over his nearest challenger, Greasepaint. At the finishing post, Corbiere pipped Greasepaint to victory by three-quarters-of-a-length. Yer Man was third.

Corbiere went on to finish third in the next two Grand Nationals, he fell in his fourth consecutive National and finished 12th in his fifth and final entry in 1987.

Race Card
Many long time ante post bets had already been beaten on the eve of the race when top weight, and ante post favourite, Ashley House was withdrawn due to the expected heavy ground. Last year's winner, Grittar was now installed both as joint top weight and 6/1 favourite, despite a disrupted preparation, which saw him race just twice all season without distinction. Champion jockey John Francome was booked but he was then ruled out through injury, the ride going instead to Paul Barton, with his partner in victory, Dick Saunders having retired. Barton kept the favourite in the front rank throughout the race, surviving a jumping error at the fence before Becher's Brook second time to remain in contention, never more than a few lengths behind the leader. An injection of pace going towards the penultimate flight saw the four horses in front of him kick on and Grittar was unable to stay with them, fading to finish a remote fifth.

Bonum Omen took much of the support of those considered to be knowledgeable in the National. Weighted at under eleven stones and with good form over long distances over the winter, the only question mark appeared to be over his jumping. Kevin Mooney took the ride but was never able to get his mount into the race and they were well adrift by the time other horses stopped in front of him and caused them to refuse at the twentieth fence.

Spartan Missile had broken down badly after finishing second in the 1981 Grand National but impressed his backers when winning at Newbury earlier in the year. His former partner, John Thorne had died in a riding accident in 1982 so Hywel Davies took the ride. They were middle to rear throughout the race but still in a position capable of mounting a challenge when falling at Becher's second time.

Peaty Sandy was a former Welsh National winner, although beaten third in the race the previous Christmas but his quality ensured he went off at 12/1 as the best backed horse ever trained by a woman. The ride on Helen Hamilton's horse was given to T.G. Dun. He was never in contention during the race however, jumping Becher's Brook last of the fourteen to take the fence on the second circuit. He picked his way through tired horses in the latter stages of the race to finish a remote sixth.

Corbiere had narrowly won the Welsh National in December. A further win at Doncaster and another decent performance when finishing second at the Cheltenham Festival gave justification to his 13/1 starting price. Jenny Pitman's horse was ridden by Ben De Haan who took his mount into the front rank from the start and disputed the lead with Hallo Dandy from the twentieth to twenty-eighth fences before kicking on. Taking a clear lead from the penultimate flight, Corbiere looked to have the race won at the elbow before having to fend off a late challenge from Greasepaint to ensure his victory.

The narrowly beaten Greasepaint had been the best supported Irish entry at 14/1 after winning the Kim Muir Chase at the recent Cheltenham meeting. Amateur, Colin Magnier was among thirteen riders making their National debut and almost timed his run to perfection, just falling short to finish second. Mid Day Gun was also sent off at 14/1 with another debut rider, Graham McCourt after two excellent prep races. Their experience proved very different, ending at the first fence. Keengaddy had finished second in the previous year's Topham Chase and was also considered to be in great form to be sent off at 15/1. He was jumping freely and moved towards the head of the field when carried out at the Canal Turn. He battled on in rear for another three fences before falling. The majority of the remainder of public money went on the Peter Scudamore ridden Fortina's Express, Welsh National runner up, Pilot Officer, Topham winner, Beacon Time and previous National third and Scottish National runner up, Three To One.

Finishing order

Non-finishers

Media coverage and aftermath
The BBC broadcast the race live on Television for the twenty-fourth consecutive year, as part of its regular Saturday afternoon Grandstand programme. The programme was hosted by David Coleman, as he had done in all but two of the previous twenty-three National broadcasts. For the twelfth consecutive year, the commentary team consisted of John Hanmer, Julian Wilson and lead commentator, Peter O'Sullevan who was calling his thirty-eighth Grand National on Radio or Television. The race was also broadcast live on BBC Radio for the fifty-third consecutive renewal as part of Radio Two's Sport on Two Saturday afternoon Sports programme. The BBC also screened a short late evening highlights programme on BBC1, presented by Julian Wilson.

Although the race was sponsored by a National newspaper, The Sun, most other major National and regional daily newspapers still published their own race cards in their Friday evening or Saturday editions. For the major nationals this posed the dilemma of having to advertise a rival paper when having to describe the race as the Sun Grand National.

References

 1983
Grand National
Grand National
Grand National
20th century in Merseyside